Darlene Tiffany Moore was a 12-year-old girl from Boston who, at 9:05 pm on Friday, August 19, 1988, was unintentionally struck and killed by two stray bullets fired by feuding drug dealers as she was sitting on a neighborhood mailbox.

Moore became an example of Boston's epidemic of gang violence at the time. In Roxbury, one of Boston's more economically depressed neighborhoods, citizens were outraged by the incident.

"The future of Roxbury was represented in her," said then-Roxbury City Council member Bruce C. Bolling. "That's why people were so upset and angry. They thought, 'That could have been my daughter, my son, my husband, my wife, anybody who goes about his daily business.'"

Shawn Drumgold was convicted of Moore's death on October 13, 1989.  In November 2003, Drumgold's conviction was overturned. Drumgold was assisted by lawyer Rosemary C. Scapicchio in his successful retrial.

Moore's death was recounted in the song Wildside by Marky Mark and the Funky Bunch, which reached 10 on the Billboard music charts.

References 

1976 births
1988 deaths
People murdered in Massachusetts
People from Boston
Deaths by firearm in Massachusetts
Murdered American children